The Škoda Rapid Six was a car manufactured by Skoda in 1935. The larger sister model of the Škoda Rapid, the two-door coupe had a streamlined body in wood-steel hybrid construction. Only four such cars were ever made.

Technical specifications 
The gasoline-powered, water-cooled car had the following specifications:
 Capacity: 
 Bore: 
 Stroke: 
 Compression ratio: 6.0:1
 Maximum power:  at 3500 rpm
 Wheelbase: 
 Front track: 
 Rear track: 
 Length: 
 Width: 
 Height: 
 Weight: 
 Maximum speed:

References 

Coupés
Škoda